André Ramseyer (January 31, 1914 in Tramelan – January 15, 2007 in Neuchâtel) was a Swiss sculptor, who lived in Neuchâtel. He had been working in Neuchâtel since 1942, after working in l'Ecole d'art à La Chaux-de-Fonds between 1932 and 1935, and staying in Paris (between 1935 and 1936) and Italy for a few short periods of time. In Neuchâtel, he taught Art and the History of Art until 1956. He returned to Paris in 1949, but went back to Neuchâtel later that year. He stopped working in the 1990s, although he kept the key to his studio in his pocket until the day he died.

He was heavily influenced by Henry Moore. His sculptures can be seen in many public spaces, mostly in Switzerland.

1914 births
2007 deaths
Swiss sculptors
20th-century sculptors